Cheiromoniliophora elegans is a species of fungi in the order Pleosporales in the class Dothideomycetes. It is the type species of its genus.

References

External links 

 Cheiromoniliophora elegans at Mycobank.org

Pleosporales
Fungi described in 1990